Dane Baptiste (born 3 September 1984) is a British stand-up comedian, writer and presenter. He was the first Black British act to be nominated for the "Best Newcomer" award at 2014's Edinburgh Comedy Awards and his comedy series Sunny D premiered on BBC Three in Spring 2016. He has made numerous TV and radio appearances, and hosts his own podcast Dane Baptiste Questions Everything. In January 2021, Baptiste's comedy pilot Bamous launched on BBC Three / BBC One.

Early life
Baptiste is from Hither Green, South East London.  He attended Haberdashers' Hatcham College in New Cross, and then achieved a degree in business at Bradford University. He worked in media sales before becoming a comedian.

Stand up career
Baptiste started performing stand-up comedy in 2012.

Baptiste was the first Black Briton to be nominated for the 2014 “Best Newcomer” Edinburgh Comedy Award. After the success of his debut stand up-show “Citizen Dane”, he completed two sold-out runs at London's Soho Theatre (with additional dates added to accommodate demand).

He was nominated for a Chortle award in 2015.

His second stand-up show “Reasonable Doubts” sold out and was met with critical acclaim at the 2015 Edinburgh Fringe Festival, with his first nationwide solo tour following in 2016.

In 2018, Baptiste set out on a world tour, including Australia and New Zealand, with his smash-hit third stand-up hour G.O.D. (Gold. Oil. Drugs.) about the worldwide pursuit of wealth, power and pleasure.

In 2021, Baptiste launched a new show and international tour, The Chocolate Chip.

Television career
Baptiste has made various television appearances on
Sweat the Small Stuff,
Virtually Famous,
Celebrity Squares,
Safeword,
Live at the Apollo,
Live from the BBC,
Alan Davies: As Yet Untitled,
Mock the Week, 
8 Out of 10 Cats Does Countdown, Pants of Fire, Stand Up Sketch Show, Pointless, Comedy Central's Roast Battle, Comedians Giving Lectures, Comedians Solving World Problems, Gagging Order, Elevenish, CelebAbility, Black, British and Funny, Frankie Boyle's New World Order, and Alan Davies: As Yet Untitled.

He has hosted Live At The Apollo (BBC Two), Live from the Comedy Store (Comedy Central) and Tonight at the London Palladium (ITV1).

In December 2018 he won a week-long series in the BBC's House of Games.

In 2016 Baptiste created, wrote and starred in sitcom Sunny D, which was then purchased for an American remake in 2018 by Lionsgate Pictures.

During the 2020 lockdown Baptiste performed on The Big Night In for Children in Need and Comic Relief.

In January 2021, Baptiste's BBC pilot Bamous premiered on BBC Three / BBC One.

Writing career 
In 2016 Baptiste wrote his first sitcom Sunny D. Baptiste was the first black comedian to write a commissioned pilot for the BBC that became a series.

Baptiste wrote for Idris Elba at the 2018 FIFA Awards.

In 2020, Baptiste created and wrote BBC pilot Bamous.

Other work
Baptiste hosts his own podcast Dane Baptiste Questions Everything, is a member of comedy collective Quotas Full and is currently working on numerous scripted projects for both the UK and US.

He has also appeared on other podcasts including Evil Genius with Russell Kane, West: Word - The Westworld podcast for Sky TV, Geoff Lloyd's Hometown Glory on Union Jack Radio, FRANK with Olivia Lee and Maria Shehat, The Gaffer Tapes: Fantasy Football Podcast, and Mo Money, Mo Problems with Mo Gilligan.

He has been a guest on BBC Radio 4's "Just A Minute." "Just A Minute," </ref> Just A Minute, 14 June 2022</ref>

References

External links

Official website

1984 births
Living people
21st-century English male actors
Black British male actors
Black British male comedians
English people of Grenadian descent

English male actors
English stand-up comedians
Male actors from London
People from the London Borough of Lewisham
21st-century English comedians